Vostochny Kildin is a rural locality (an inhabited locality) in Teribersky Territorial Okrug of Kolsky District of Murmansk Oblast, Russia, located on Kildin Island beyond the Arctic Circle at a height of  above sea level. Population: 4 (2010 Census).

References

Notes

Sources

Rural localities in Murmansk Oblast